Kottappady  is a village in Kothamangalam Taluk in Ernakulam district of Kerala State, India. It belongs to Central Kerala Division. It is located 10 km from Kothamangalam. The village came into existence in the year 1953.

Kalkunnel Mar Geevarghese Sahada Jacobite Syrian Church, one of the prominent Jacobite churches in Kerala, is situated here, one of the biggest Jacobite churches in India. Kottekkevu bhagavathi temple in south Kottappady, famous for Kottekkavu Bharani (Meenam) is the first place of worship.

Demographics
As of 2011 India census data, Kottappady had a population of 13,512 with 6,710 males and 6,802 females. The village had 3,357 households total, with approximately 87% literacy and approximately 91% of the population above age 6.

Education

Kottappady South Lower Primary School (GLPS), Kottappady North Lower Primary School (LPS), and Mar Elias Higher Secondary School (HSS) are among the oldest schools here.

Government 
Kottappaddy is under the Government of Kerala, and is part of the Legislative Assembly Constituencies (LAC) group 087: Kothamangalam under the 07 Ernakulam district.

Institutions and Services 
The government controls various village institutions and assets, including one shopping complex, one library, thirteen public wells, and eighteen public pools. Additional government institutions are shown in the table below.

References

Villages in Ernakulam district